The Hollandse Brug is a bridge structure that crosses the Gooimeer and the IJmeer in the Netherlands. The bridge carries both the Flevolijn heavy rail railway and the A6 motorway, plus a cycleway and footway.

History and importance
In 1987, the bridge carrying the Flevolijn railway between Weesp and Almere Buiten was opened adjacent to the Hollandse Brug.

References

Bridges completed in 1969
Concrete bridges in the Netherlands
Road bridges in the Netherlands
Railway bridges in the Netherlands
Bridges in Flevoland
Bridges in North Holland
Buildings and structures in Almere
Buildings and structures in Gooise Meren
Zuiderzee Works